Diggs is a surname. Notable people with the surname include:

 Anita Doreen Diggs (born 1966), American writer
 Annie Le Porte Diggs (1853–1916), Canadian writer, advocate
 Bubba Diggs  (born c. 1960), American football player and coach
 Charles Diggs (1922–1998), African-American politician
 Charles C. Diggs Sr. (1894–1967), Michigan State Senator and father of Charles Diggs
 Daveed Diggs (born 1982), American rapper and actor
 Ellen Diggs (1906–1998), American anthropologist
 Estella B. Diggs (1916–2013), American politician
 George Diggs (born 1952), biologist
 J. Frank Diggs (1917–2004), American journalist
 J-Diggs (Jamal Diggs; born 1970), American rapper
 Jamar Diggs (born 1988), American basketball player
 Jimmy Diggs (born 1955), American screenwriter
 Jimmy Diggs (born 1938), half of the soul-music duo Knight Brothers
 Joetta Clark Diggs (born 1963), American track and field runner
 Kip Diggs (born 1966), American boxer
 Lemuel Diggs (1900–1995), American pathologist
 Louis S. Diggs (born 1932), American writer and historian
 Marissa Diggs (born 1992), American soccer player
 Marshall R. Diggs (1888–1968), United States Acting Comptroller of the Currency (1938)
 Na'il Diggs (born 1978), American National Football League player
 Ra Diggs (Roland Herron), American rapper imprisoned for life
 Reese Diggs (1915–1978), Major League Baseball pitcher
 RZA, stage name of Robert Diggs (born 1969), African-American music producer, rapper and musician
 Roland Diggs (fl. 1990s), Liberian religious leader and politician
 Sally Maria Diggs (c. 1851–?), African-American slave purchased by abolitionist Henry Ward Beecher
 Taye Diggs (born 1971), African-American actor
 Quandre Diggs (born 1993), American football cornerback
 Quincy Diggs (born 1990), American basketball player
 Stefon Diggs (born 1993), American National Football League player
 Trevon Diggs (born 1997), American football player

Fictional characters:
 Oscar Diggs, better known as the Wizard of Oz (character)
 Diggs, the main character in the 2010 comedy film Cats & Dogs: The Revenge of Kitty Galore
 Diggs, in the 2005 horror film Boy Eats Girl

See also
 Diggs baronets, an extinct title in the Baronetage of England
 Diggs, Virginia, an unincorporated community
 The Diggs, a band from Brooklyn, New York
 Digges (disambiguation)
 Digg, a social news website
 "Diggs" (The Simpsons), an episode of 25th season of The Simpsons